Tan Bela (also Romanized as Tan Belā and Tonbolā) is a village in Kiakola Rural District, in the Central District of Simorgh County, Mazandaran Province, Iran. At the 2006 census, its population was 406, in 104 families.

References 

Populated places in Simorgh County